The 1982 Australian Grand Prix was a motor race held at the Melbourne International Raceway,  formerly Calder Raceway,  in Victoria, Australia on 8 November 1982.

The race, which was the 47th Australian Grand Prix, was open to racing cars complying with Australian Formula 1 regulations, which for this year included only Formula Pacific cars. It was the second Australian Grand Prix to feature only Formula Pacific cars. For the Australian-based competitors the race was also the eighth and final round of the 1982 Australian Drivers' Championship.

The race was won by Alain Prost of France driving a Ralt RT4. His subsequent victory in the 1986 Australian Grand Prix would see him secure his second straight Formula One World Championship for Drivers title and become the first driver to win the Australian Grand Prix in both its Australian domestic and World Championship formats. As of 2022 he remains as the only driver to have achieved this.

The 1982 race was the first Australian Grand Prix since 1968 in which no Australian driver placed in the first three positions. The highest-placed Australian was the Alfredo Costanzo who finished fifth in a Tiga FA81 Ford, thus clinching the 1982 Australian Drivers' Championship title. Costanzo was also the fastest Australian qualifier, starting from the third grid position behind the Ralt RT4 Fords of French Formula One drivers Alain Prost and Jacques Laffite.

Classification
Results as follows:

Qualifying

Note 1: Hanger and Fisher were listed as reserves for the race however Hanger was allowed to start after Jones withdrew during the warm-up laps.

Race

Notes 
Pole position: Alain Prost – 0'39.18
Fastest lap: Jacques Laffite – 0'39.62 (146.29 km/h, 90.90 mph) New Formula Pacific lap record.
 Winner's average speed: 143.6 km/h (89.18 mph)

References

External links
 Image of Alain Prost (Ralt RT4 Ford) on 7.11.1982, www.prostfan.com, as archived at www.webcitation.org 
 Australian Grand Prix, Calder, 7 Nov 1982, /www.oldracingcars.com

Grand Prix
Australian Grand Prix
Australian Grand Prix